Coenaculum tertium is a species of sea snail, a marine gastropod mollusc in the family Cimidae. The species is one of four known species to exist within the genus, Coenaculum, the other species are Coenaculum minutulum, Coenaculum secundum and Coenaculum weerdtae.

References

 Spencer, H.G., Marshall, B.A. & Willan, R.C. (2009). Checklist of New Zealand living Mollusca. pp 196–219 in Gordon, D.P. (ed.) New Zealand inventory of biodiversity. Volume one. Kingdom Animalia: Radiata, Lophotrochozoa, Deuterostomia. Canterbury University Press, Christchurch.

Cimidae
Gastropods of New Zealand
Gastropods described in 1952